Papyrus 53 (in the Gregory-Aland numbering), signed by 𝔓53, is an early copy of the New Testament in Greek. It is a papyrus manuscript containing parts of the Gospel of Matthew and the  Acts of the Apostles: it contains only Matthew 26:29-40 and Acts 9:33-10:1. The manuscript palaeographically had been assigned to the 3rd century. These two fragments were found together, they were part of a codex containing the four Gospels and Acts or Matthew and Acts.

The Greek text of this codex is a representative of the Alexandrian text-type (proto-Alexandrian). Aland ascribed it as "at least Normal text", and placed it in Category I.

It is currently housed at the University of Michigan (Inv. 6652) in Ann Arbor.

See also 

 List of New Testament papyri

References

Further reading 

 Henry A. Sanders, A Third Century Papyrus of Matthew and Acts, in: Quantulacumque: Studies Presented to Kirsopp Lake (London: 1937), pp. 151–161.
 

New Testament papyri
3rd-century biblical manuscripts
Early Greek manuscripts of the New Testament
Gospel of Matthew papyri
Acts of the Apostles papyri
University of Michigan